M.J. Kang is a Canadian playwright and actress.

Early life and education 
Born in Seoul, South Korea, Kang immigrated to Toronto, Ontario with her family at the age of two. She studied with the Playwrights Unit at Toronto's Tarragon Theatre.

Career 
Kang's plays include Questioning Condoms, Noran Bang: The Yellow Room, Blessings and dreams of blonde & blue. She received a Dora Mavor Moore Award nomination for Outstanding New Play, Independent Theatre Division in 1998 for Noran Bang: The Yellow Room.

As an actress, Kang had a regular role in the 1997 television series Riverdale, and made guest appearances in E.N.G., Earth: Final Conflict, The City, Doc, Strong Medicine and Medium. On stage, she has performed in productions of Jean Yoon's The Yoko Ono Project, Laurie Fyffe's The Malaysia Hotel and Oren Safdie's Private Jokes, Public Places. She has performed in productions of Private Jokes, Public Places in Toronto, New York City, London, Los Angeles and Berkeley, California.

Personal life 
She is married to Oren Safdie.

Filmography

Film

Television

References

External links 

M. J. Kang  Asian Heritage in Canada

20th-century Canadian actresses
20th-century Canadian dramatists and playwrights
20th-century Canadian women writers
21st-century Canadian actresses
21st-century Canadian dramatists and playwrights
21st-century Canadian women writers
Canadian women dramatists and playwrights
Canadian stage actresses
Canadian television actresses
South Korean emigrants to Canada
Living people
Canadian writers of Asian descent
Actresses from Seoul
Actresses from Toronto
Writers from Toronto
Canadian actresses of Korean descent
Year of birth missing (living people)